The 2019 PBA D-League Aspirants' Cup is the first conference of the 2019 Philippine Basketball Association Developmental League (PBA D-League) season. This will be the eighth Aspirants' Cup.

Format
Twenty teams were included in the tournament. The elimination round will be divided into two groups of ten teams each. Each team will play the teams in its group once. The top four teams per group qualify for the quarterfinals. The higher-seed team in the quarterfinals will have the twice-to-beat advantage against the lower-seeded team from the other group. The quarterfinals winners advance to the semifinals, which is a best-of-3 series. The semifinals winners advance to the Finals, which is a best-of-5 series.

Venues

Most games will be played at the Ynares Sports Arena in Pasig. Other venues include the Paco Arena in Manila, JCSGO Gym and the Trinity University of Asia, both in Quezon City.

Teams

Returning teams from the 2018 PBA D-League Foundation Cup:
AMA Online Education Titans
Batangas EAC Generals
CEU Scorpions
Che'Lu Bar and Grill Revellers
Go for Gold Scratchers
Partnered with the Benilde Blazers
Marinerong Pilipino Skippers

Returning teams from previous conferences:
Cignal Hawkeyes
Partnered with the Ateneo Blue Eagles
Perpetual Altas
Wangs Basketball Couriers

New teams:
CD14 Designs–Trinity White Stallions
Diliman College Blue Dragons–Gerry's Grill
FamilyMart–Enderun Titans
FEU Tamaraws
McDavid Apparels
Metropac Movers–San Beda Red Lions
Petron–Letran Knights
SMDC–NU Bulldogs
Ironcon–UST Growling Tigers
Valencia City–San Sebastian Stags
Virtual Reality–St. Clare Saints

On May 7, the Cha Dao–FEU Tamaraws dropped the sponsorship by Cha Dao Milk Tea for lack of payments. FEU team manager Richie Ticzon said Cha Dao owed them a "substantial amount of money."

The Far Eastern University now plan to press charges against James Machate after FEU and Cha Dao owner James Marcaida convened following their split in the 2019 PBA D-League.

Elimination round

Group A

Team standings

Results

Group B

Team standings

Results

Playoff bracket

Quarterfinals
Higher seeded teams has the twice-to-beat advantage against the lower seeded teams of the other group.

(A1) Cignal-Ateneo vs. (B4) Cha Dao-FEU

(B1) Valencia City-San Sebastian vs. (A4) Che'Lu

(A2) Virtual Reality-St. Clare vs. (B3) Metropac Movers-San Beda

(B2) CEU vs. (A3) Go for Gold-CSB

Semifinals
This round is in a best-of-3 format. The winner advances to the finals.

(A1) Cignal-Ateneo vs. (B1) Valencia City-San Sebastian

(B2) CEU vs. (A2) Virtual Reality-St. Clare

Finals: (A1) Cignal-Ateneo vs. (B2) CEU
This round is in a best-of-5 format. The winner wins the championship.

References

Aspirants' Cup
2019
2018–19 in Philippine basketball leagues